The Philippine Basketball Association's Best Player of the Conference Award is given to the best local (Filipino or part-Filipino) player at the end of each conference (tournament). It was first awarded in the 1994 All-Filipino Conference.

The Best Import Award is given to the best player (non-Filipino) at the end of each import-laden conference.

Criteria
The method of selecting the Best Player of the Conference is similar on how the season's Most Valuable Player is selected. The criteria used since the 2022–23 PBA season are as follows:
45% average statistical points
30% press and media votes
25% players' votes

Statistical points (SP) are computed as follows:
1 SP for every point scored, rebound, assist, steal and blocked shot.
10 bonus points for every game won where the player played up to the semifinals.
15 bonus points for every game won where the player played in the Finals
Deduction of 1 SP for every turnover, 5 SP for every technical or flagrant foul without ejection, and 15 SP for any technical or flagrant foul that results in an ejection.

In addition, a Filipino player can only be eligible for awards if he played in at least 70% of his team's games.

Winners

Multiple-time winners

References

Best Player
Awards established in 1994
Most valuable player awards
1994 establishments in the Philippines